The D/W series is a line of pickup trucks that was sold by Dodge from October 1960 to September 30, 1993. The same basic design was retained until the October 1993 introduction of a completely redesigned Ram. The D/W series shared its AD platform with the Dodge Ramcharger/Plymouth Trail Duster twins. 4x2 models were designated D, while 4x4 models were designated W.



First generation (1961–65) 

The original design was built until the spring of 1965, when the facelifted, single-headlamp version arrived. For 1963, Dodge introduced a four-door crew-cab version of the D series, becoming the first "Big Three" American manufacturer to market a factory-produced truck with two rows of seating (following the 1961 introduction of the International Travelette).

The first generation of the D series was manufactured in Warren, Michigan. They were given the Dodge and Fargo brands. The trucks were produced by the Dodge Division of the Chrysler Corporation.

Custom Sports Special and high-performance package
1964 saw the introduction of the sporty Custom Sports Special. The Custom Sports Special included bucket seats, console, carpeting and racing stripes. The optional high-performance package could be ordered with a CSS truck or by itself on a base model truck complete with Chrysler's big  wedge-head V8 for 1964 and  V8 for 1965. The 426 cubic inch engine produced 365 hp (272 kW) and 470 lb·ft (637 N·m)—in line with the muscle-car revolution that was then sweeping Detroit. The high-performance package also included the LoadFlite automatic transmission, a 6000 rpm-rated Sun tachometer with heavy-duty gauges, power steering, dual exhaust and rear axle torque rods (traction bars) sourced from 1961 Imperials. Custom Sports Special trucks were produced from 1964 to 1967. The high-performance package required customized fabrication including tailor-made traction bar brackets, alterations to the frame cross members and an enlarged firewall to make room for the exhaust manifold. The High Performance Package was only offered from 1964 to early 1966.

Second generation (1965–71)

1965–67

The D series was mildly redesigned in spring of 1965, hence there are both two-headlight and four-headlight models titled as 1965s. Updates for mid-'65 included a wider tailgate and the replacement of the A-series engines with the updated LA series, as well as a six-inch wheelbase stretch on  bed models. In 1967, the D-series trucks received big-block 383 2-barrel engines as a standard option.

From 1965 until the early 80s, D-series trucks were assembled in Warren, Michigan by the Chrysler Corporation. Foreign models were manufactured by the Automotive Equipment Group (מכשירי תנועה בע"מ) in Israel at a new factory located at Nazareth-I'llit: Automotive Industries (תעשיות רכב נצרת-עלית), using straight-four and -six gasoline engines with manual transmission. This factory also produced the Jeep Wagoneer SUV for the Israeli Army, and UK Ford Escort and Ford Transit vehicles for the civilian market. The D series were made both for the civilian market and for the Israeli Army. The models were D100 & D200 light trucks, D500 truck, and the D600 truck with the straight-six engine and having on-demand four-wheel drive. There was also a bus version made (mainly for army use). This bus was a 20-seat bus built on the chassis of the D500 truck using the straight-four engine with front and rear hydraulic doors, as well as the complete D500 front end and dashboard.

1968–71

The 1968 models received a new front grille—two rows of four holes each. A new Adventurer trim package replaced the old Custom Sports Special; basically, it included a padded front seat with vinyl trim (either full bench or buckets with console) and carpeting, plus other hallmarks such as extra chrome trim and courtesy lighting. This generation continued to be built in South Africa as well. Sold as the D300 or the D500, the lighter model received the 225 Slant-Six, while the heavier-duty D500 has the 318 ci V8.

By 1970, the Adventurer would be expanded into three separate packages: the base Adventurer, the Adventurer Sport and the top-line Adventurer SE. The Adventurer SE included such things as a chrome grille, wood trim on the dashboard, the padded vinyl front seat with color-keyed seatbelts, full courtesy lighting, extra insulation, dual horns, full carpeting, luxury door panel trim, a vinyl-embossed trim strip ran along the sides of the truck, full wheel discs and a woodgrain-insert panel on the tailgate. The 1970 models also featured a new four-section grille (two rows of two holes each).

"The Dude"
In August 1969, the "Dude Sport Trim Package" was released. This was essentially the D100 already in production, with an added black or white body-side "C" stripe decal; a Dodge Dude decal on the box at the rear marker lamps; tail lamp bezel trim; and dog dish hub caps with trim rings. The Dude's tailgate was unique, featuring a Dodge decal on a flat tailgate surface, without the typical tailgate's embossed logo. The Dudes were only offered in the 1970 and 1971 model years and only 1,500 to 2,000 Dudes were produced. Actor Don Knotts promoted The Dude in its marketing campaigns.

Third generation (1972–93)

A redesign of the D series for the 1972 model year introduced a more rounded look. Styling cues, such as the scalloped hood and rounded fenderwells, were similar to the rounded, smooth look of the 1971 Plymouth Satellite. These trucks were built with a considerable amount of galvanized steel to resist rust and corrosion, making them very durable.

Dodge pioneered the extended-cab pickup with the introduction of the Club Cab with the 1973 models. Inward-facing jump seats were available, providing room for five passengers. 1974 saw the introduction of the 440  engine as an option for the light trucks, as well as a "Dyna-Trac" dual-rear-wheel option on D300 pickups with a  GVWR.

The 1972 D series was made famous in the television show Emergency!, where a D300 chassis cab was the featured paramedic rescue squad vehicle for all seven seasons.

Special models

Notable models produced during this era were the 1978–1979 Li'l Red Express, the Warlock, the Macho Power Wagon, the Macho Power Wagon Top Hand, Macho Power Wagon Palomino, and the Adventurer.

The Warlock, as part of Dodge's late 1970s "adult toys" line, is a short wheelbase truck produced in limited production in 1976 and regular production from 1977 to 1979. Warlocks came in black, red, green and blue, however other colors could be special ordered. Its main draw was being a factory customized truck, also known as a "trick truck", and was designed to appeal to young 4x4 buyers. The Warlock featured custom gold wheels, wide tires, bucket seats, and a Utiline bed with oak racks. Optional equipment included five-spoke wheels, bucket seats, tinted glass, chrome rear bumper, and power steering. All had black interiors, with gold accents on the dash and the doors, and a "tuff" steering wheel. The exterior was accented by gold pin striping around the wheel wells and the body lines. The pin striping continued inside onto the doors, dashboard, and instrument panel. Warlock was printed in gold on the tailgate through 1978; the 1979 model instead had "Warlock II" printed.

The colors of the Dodge Macho Power Wagon Palomino were the same as a Palomino horse (all Li'l Red Express trucks were Adventurers, though the reverse was not true).  The Li'l Red Express was not available for sale in California, Florida, Maryland, Oregon and Washington and did not meet special noise standards in certain locations.  Because of this the Midnite Express was born.
The Midnite Express was not a factory option like the Li'l Red Express, it was a dealer installed package.  Dealers that could not sell the Li'l Red Express used high optioned Warlocks, repainted them metallic black and ordered all of the Li'l Red Express parts through their parts department.  The Midnite Express was available for the 1978 model year only. This truck was equipped much like the Li'l Red Express with exhaust stacks, wheels, and gold pinstriping. The Midnite Express was painted black instead of red and featured a "Midnite Express Truck" decal on the door. Most Midnite Express trucks were powered by the 440 engine, instead of the 360 like the Li'l Red Express. All of these trucks were considered "lifestyle" pickups and were marketed to an audience that wanted specialty, personal-use trucks.

Diesel
The 1978 models also saw the introduction of the first diesel powered Dodge pickup truck. The diesel used standard Dodge manual and automatic transmissions via specially made adapter plate which had the LA V8 bolt pattern. This rare factory option, VIN code H, was the result of fuel crisis and the collaboration of Chrysler and Mitsubishi. The engine, while being trustworthy and having far better economy than any other engine in the Dodge lineup at the time, suffered from low power output and was considered to be underpowered by American standards, even though it was previously used in the Japanese 3.5-ton cab-over Mitsubishi T44 Jupiter Truck and in industrial applications. Because of the low sales, it was phased out quickly, and as a result, it became practically a single-year specialty.

Thousands of D-series trucks entered military service as the M880 series CUCV.

Dodge Ram (1981–93)

This final generation received a facelift in October 1980 when the D series was rebadged as the Dodge Ram pickup around when Lee Iacocca took charge of the ailing Chrysler Corporation. Such things including an embossed "DODGE RAM" name on the tailgate along with other obvious changes like the grille and hood, the taillights, and the entire interior. More subtle was the addition of a "shoulder" line reminiscent of the GM competition. Beginning in 1982, even more corrosion-resistant steel was used in the construction of the trucks. This body style continued until 1993 and many of these vehicles are still on the road. Many body panels are interchangeable for all models from 1971 to 1993, so it is not uncommon to see a "hybrid" with, as an example, a 1978 grille mounted with a 1974 hood and a 1991 cab. Sometimes the bed is swapped with a moving truck style box for models like these. In most jurisdictions, the year is dictated by the year of the truck's chassis regardless of the body which has been bolted to it. Also kept was the narrow Utiline bed that dated back to the 1940s; this was dropped in 1985. Throttle-body injection was introduced in 1988.

The slant-6 was supplanted by the  V6 for 1988; in 1992 it and the V8s became Magnum engines. The 6BT  12-Valve Cummins B-series diesel engine became an option in 1989.

Sales were good during the Sweptline era and into the late 1970s. A combination of stagnant styling that was nearly two decades old plus brand loyalty primarily to Chevrolet and Ford during the 1980s and 1990s reduced sales volume for the first-generation Dodge Ram. A wholly new Dodge Ram was released for the 1994 model year.

Engines

In popular culture

A 1972 Dodge D-300 was used as a LA County Fire Department paramedic rescue vehicle, also known as Squad 51 in the television show Emergency!. The utility body was custom built by Universal Studios for Emergency! according to the Los Angeles County Fire Department's specifications for its paramedic rescue vehicles.  After the series ended it was donated to the LA County Fire Department and placed into the reserve fleet where it was occasionally put into service as a Paramedic Squad. Subsequently it was transferred to the department's Museum and was then restored thoroughly in 1999. The only change in the restoration was a diesel engine which replaced the engine that was previously used. There were three Dodge D-series vehicles used in the filming of Emergency!, a 1971, 1972 and a 1973 Dodge D-300. The 1972 and the 1973 were identical except for the grilles.

In the Supernatural episode "Route 666", the ghost of a deceased man haunts a town as a phantom D300. The vehicle is extensively modified, particularly through the addition of two diesel smokestacks, and filmed in such a way that identifying features are hard to see. The truck is most recognizable in a scene where Sam and Dean Winchester pull the actual wreckage of the truck out of a pond.

In the TV series Simon & Simon, the character Rick Simon owned a red 1979 Dodge Macho Power Wagon.

See also
Fargo Trucks

Notes

External links

 1961–71 Dodge Truck Website (Medium & Heavy Duty Trucks)
 Old Dodges.com (Medium & Heavy Duty Dodges)

Cars introduced in 1960
1970s cars
1980s cars
All-wheel-drive vehicles
D series
Pickup trucks
Rear-wheel-drive vehicles